The Beneš-Mráz Be-60 Bestiola was a Czechoslovakian light aircraft produced in the 1930s. The highwing monoplane had two side-by-side seats in an enclosed cabin, braced wings, and a fixed undercarriage. It was first flown in 1935, undergoing testing quickly. Twenty of these aircraft were then sent out to Czechoslovakian flying clubs from April to November 1936.

Specifications

References

1930s Czechoslovakian sport aircraft
Bestiola
Single-engined tractor aircraft
High-wing aircraft